The Brazilian Mathematical Society Award is the highest award for mathematical expository writing. It consists of a prize of R$20,000 and a certificate, and is awarded biennial by the Brazilian Mathematical Society in recognition of an outstanding expository article on a mathematical topic.

Winners

See also

 List of mathematics awards

External links 
Brazilian Mathematical Society Award.
Regulations Governing the Brazilian Mathematical Society Award.

References

Mathematics awards
Awards established in 2013
Brazilian Mathematical Society